Edgar de Gannes (2 March 1867 – 18 July 1934) was a Trinidadian cricketer. He played in three first-class matches for Trinidad and Tobago from 1891 to 1894.

See also
 List of Trinidadian representative cricketers

References

1867 births
1934 deaths
Trinidad and Tobago cricketers